Mały Buczek may refer to:

Mały Buczek, Kępno County, a village in the administrative district of Gmina Rychtal, Kępno County, Poland
Mały Buczek, Złotów County, a village in the administrative district of Gmina Lipka, Złotów County, Poland